This is a corporate history of SpaceX, an American aerospace manufacturer and space transport services company founded by Elon Musk.

Overview
In 2001, Musk conceptualised "Mars Oasis", a project to land a miniature experimental greenhouse containing seeds with dehydrated gel on Mars to grow plants on Martian soil, "so this would be the furthest that life's ever travelled" in an attempt to regain public interest in space exploration and increase the budget of NASA. In August 2001, Musk shared a plenary talk with Mike Griffin at the fourth Mars Society convention where he announced his plans to send his greenhouse to Mars. In October 2001, Musk travelled to Moscow with Jim Cantrell and Adeo Ressi to buy refurbished Dnepr ICBMs that could send the envisioned payloads into space.

The group met with companies such as Lavochkin and ISC Kosmotras. However, according to Cantrell, Musk was seen as a novice and was consequently spat on by one of the Russian chief designers, and the group returned to the US empty-handed. In February 2002, the group returned to Russia to look for three ICBMs, bringing Mike Griffin, who had worked for the CIA's venture capital arm, In-Q-Tel; NASA's Jet Propulsion Laboratory; and was just leaving Orbital Sciences Corporation, a maker of satellites and spacecraft. The group met again with Kosmotras, and were offered one rocket for US$8 million. However, this was seen by Musk as too expensive and Musk left the meeting. While on the return flight Musk realized that he could start a company which could build the affordable rockets he needed. According to early Tesla and SpaceX investor Steve Jurvetson, Musk calculated that the raw materials for building a rocket actually were only 3 percent of the sales price of a rocket at the time. By applying vertical integration — principally for cost reasons; around 85% of the entire Falcon/Dragon vehicle is produced in-house — and the modular approach from software engineering (Falcon 9 uses 9 of the Merlin engines, which were tested on the single-engine Falcon 1, Falcon Heavy uses three Falcon 9 booster stages), SpaceX could cut launch price by a factor of ten and still enjoy a 70 percent gross margin. For example, SpaceX had to design a machine that could friction stir weld aluminum-lithium alloy for the airframe of the Falcon 9 because such a machine did not exist. According to Musk SpaceX started with the smallest useful orbital rocket (Falcon 1 with about half a ton to orbit) instead of building a more complex and riskier launch vehicle, which could have failed and bankrupted the company.

In early 2002 Musk was seeking staff for the new company and approached rocket engineer Tom Mueller, who would eventually become SpaceX's CTO of Propulsion until 2020. SpaceX was first headquartered in a 75,000 square feet warehouse in El Segundo, California. Musk decided SpaceX's first rocket would be named Falcon 1, after their first contract with the DARPA Falcon Project and as a nod to Star Wars' Millennium Falcon. Musk planned for Falcon 1's first launch to occur in November 2003, 15 months after the company started.

In January 2005 SpaceX bought a 10% stake in Surrey Satellite Technology. By March 2006, Musk had invested  in SpaceX.

On August 4, 2008, SpaceX accepted a further $20 million investment from Founders Fund. In early 2012, approximately two-thirds of the company was owned by its founder and his 70 million shares were then estimated to be worth $875 million on private markets, which roughly valued SpaceX at $1.3 billion as of February 2012. After the COTS 2+ flight in May 2012, the company private equity valuation nearly doubled to $2.4 billion.

On 16 June 2009 SpaceX announced the opening of its Astronaut Safety and Mission Assurance Department. It hired former NASA astronaut Ken Bowersox to oversee the department as a vice president of the company. However, it has since been reported that the former astronaut subsequently left SpaceX in late 2011. No reason was given and no replacement in that position has been announced.

In 2012 SpaceX advertised a launch price of $57 million on Falcon 9, while Arianespace was advertising a launch price of $137 million per launch.

In 2012 an initial public offering (IPO) was perceived as possible by the end of 2013, but then Musk stated in June 2013 that he planned to hold off any potential IPO until after the "Mars Colonial Transporter is flying regularly", and this was reiterated in 2015 indicating that it would be many years before SpaceX would become a publicly traded company, where Musk stated that "I just don’t want [SpaceX] to be controlled by some private equity firm that would milk it for near-term revenue"

The company has grown rapidly since it was founded, growing from 160 employees in November 2005 to more than 500 by July 2008, to over 1,100 in 2010, 1,800 in early 2012,
and 3,000 by early 2013. The company had grown to 3,800 employees and contractors by October 2013, and had "nearly 5,000" in late 2015 and February 2016.

After the setback of the launchpad explosion, SpaceX successfully got back to flying on 14 January 2017, with its launch of Iridium satellites. On February 19, 2017, a Falcon 9 carrying CRS-10 conducted the first launch from Kennedy Space Center's Launch Complex 39A. The first stage of the launch planned on the end of February, 2017 will be the recovered and refurbished one from April 8, 2016.

On May 23, 2019, SpaceX successfully deployed the first 60 of around 12,000 satellites in its planned Starlink - which it aims to use to provide low latency network communications via a large constellation in low Earth orbit (LEO).

On May 30, 2020, SpaceX successfully launched two NASA astronauts (Douglas Hurley and Robert Behnken) into orbit on a Crew Dragon spacecraft during SpaceX Demo-2, making SpaceX the first private company to send astronauts to the International Space Station and marking the first crewed launch from American soil in 9 years. The mission launched from Launch Complex 39A of the Kennedy Space Center in Florida. SpaceX Demo-2 successfully docked with the ISS on May 31, 2020 and returned the astronauts safely on Aug 2, 2020.

Goals

Musk has stated that one of his goals is to improve the cost and reliability of access to space, ultimately by a factor of ten. In 2004 the company plans called for "development of a heavy lift product and even a super-heavy, if there is customer demand", with each size increase resulting in a significant decrease in cost per pound to orbit. Musk said: "I believe $500 per pound ($1,100/kg) or less is very achievable."

A major goal of SpaceX has been to develop a rapidly reusable launch system. , including a test program of the low-altitude, low-speed Grasshopper vertical takeoff, vertical landing (VTVL) technology demonstrator rocket, and a high-altitude, high-speed Falcon 9 post-mission booster return test campaign where—beginning in mid-2013, with the sixth overall flight of Falcon 9—every first stage will be instrumented and equipped as a controlled descent test vehicle to accomplish propulsive-return over-water tests. SpaceX COO Gwynne Shotwell said at the Singapore Satellite Industry Forum in summer 2013 "If we get this [reusable technology] right, and we’re trying very hard to get this right, we’re looking at launches to be in the  range, which would really change things dramatically."

Musk stated in a 2011 interview that he hopes to send humans to Mars' surface within 10–20 years. In 2010, Musk's calculations convinced him that the colonization of Mars was possible. In June 2013, Musk used the descriptor Mars Colonial Transporter to refer to the privately funded development project to design and build a spaceflight system of rocket engines, launch vehicles and space capsules to transport humans to Mars and return to Earth. In March 2014, COO Gwynne Shotwell said that once the Falcon Heavy and Dragon 2 crew version are flying, the focus for the company engineering team will be on developing the technology to support the transport infrastructure necessary for Mars missions.

In August 2020, SpaceX indicated it was looking to build a resort in South Texas with the intent to turn "Boca Chica into a '21st century Spaceport".

Achievements 

Major achievements of SpaceX include:
 The first privately funded, liquid-fueled rocket (Falcon 1) to reach orbit (28 September 2008)
 The first privately funded company to successfully launch (by Falcon 9), orbit and recover a spacecraft (Dragon) (9 December 2010)
 The first private company to send a spacecraft (Dragon) to the International Space Station (25 May 2012)
 The first private company to send a satellite into geosynchronous orbit (SES-8, 3 December 2013)
 The first private company to send a probe beyond Earth orbit (Deep Space Climate Observatory, 11 February 2015)
 The first landing of a first stage orbital capable rocket (Falcon 9, Flight 20) (22 December 2015 1:39 UTC)
 The first water landing of a first stage orbital capable rocket (Falcon 9) (8 April 2016 20:53 UTC)
 The development of the most powerful operational rocket as of 2020 (Falcon Heavy, first flight 6 February 2018)
 The first private company to send humans into orbit (Crew Dragon Demo-2, 30 May 2020)

Setbacks 

On March 1, 2013, a Dragon spacecraft in orbit developed problems with its thrusters. Due to blocked fuel valves, the craft was unable to properly control itself. SpaceX engineers were able to remotely clear the blockages. Because of this, it arrived at the International Space Station one day later than expected. Since spacecraft like the Dragon were classified as munitions, and considered weapons under arms regulations until November 2014, SpaceX Mission controllers were unable to release more information to the public.

On June 28, 2015 CRS-7 launched a Falcon 9 carrying an unmanned Dragon capsule intended to take supplies to the International Space Station. 2 minutes and 19 seconds into the flight a cloud of vapor was seen by the tracking camera forming outside the craft. A few seconds afterward there was a loss of pressure in the helium tank, after which they exploded, causing a complete failure of the mission. The software was not programmed to deploy the parachute for the Dragon capsule after a launch mishap, therefore the Dragon broke upon impact. The problem was discovered to be a failed 2 ft (61 cm) steel strut, purchased from a supplier, on a helium pressure vessel, which broke due to the force of acceleration. This caused a breach and allowed helium to escape causing the loss of the spacecraft, which exploded. The software issue was also fixed; in addition, an analysis of the entire program was carried out in order to ensure proper abort mechanisms are in place for future rockets and their payload. SpaceX President Gwynne Shotwell stated that in terms of the differences between the six previous successful Falcon 9 Commercial Resupply Launches, "there’s nothing that stands out as being different for any particular flight." Though the craft was set to bring a resupply of food and water to the ISS, the crew members had enough supplies to last another 4 months before another resupply, which would end up being the Russian Progress 60P vehicle. Student science experiments, as well as a docking adapter and other miscellaneous cargo, were lost due to CRS-7 failure as well.

On September 1, 2016, a Falcon 9 Full Thrust launch vehicle exploded during a propellant fill operation for a standard pre-launch static fire test at Cape Canaveral Launch Complex 40. There were no reported injuries, as the area was cleared for the test. However the payload, the Spacecom AMOS-6 communications satellite valued at $200 million, was destroyed. Spacecom claims its contract, since the launch failed, allows it to choose to receive $50 million or a future flight at no cost. Musk described the event as the "most difficult and complex failure" ever in SpaceX's 14-year history; SpaceX reviewed nearly 3,000 channels of telemetry and video data covering a period of 35–55 milliseconds for the postmortem. In late September, SpaceX stated that interim results suggested that a major breach of the cryogenic helium system of the second stage rocket had occurred. In November 2016, Musk reported the explosion was caused by the liquid oxygen used as the oxidizer turning so cold that it became a solid, and it may have breached the helium pressure vessels which are immersed in the liquid oxygen. The vessels are overwrapped with a carbon composite material. The solid oxygen, under pressure, could have ignited with the carbon material causing the explosion. SpaceX concluded its investigation on 2 January 2017 then successfully restarted its business of launching rockets in January 2017.

Funding
SpaceX is privately funded. SpaceX developed its first launch vehicle—Falcon 1—and three rocket engines—Merlin, Kestrel, and Draco—completely with private capital. SpaceX contracted with the US government for a portion of the development funding for the Falcon 9 launch vehicle, which uses a modified version of the Merlin rocket engine. SpaceX is developing the Falcon Heavy launch vehicle, the Raptor methane-fueled rocket engine, and a set of reusable launch vehicle technologies with private capital.

, SpaceX had operated on total funding of approximately $1 billion in its first ten years of operation. Of this, private equity provided about $200M, with Musk investing approximately $100M and other investors having put in about $100M (Founders Fund, Draper Fisher Jurvetson, ...). The remainder has come from progress payments on long-term launch contracts and development contracts. , NASA had put in about $400–500M of this amount, with most of that as progress payments on launch contracts. By May 2012, SpaceX had contracts for 40 launch missions, and each of those contracts provide down payments at contract signing, plus many are paying progress payments as launch vehicle components are built in advance of mission launch, driven in part by US accounting rules for recognizing long-term revenue.

In August 2012, SpaceX signed a large development contract with NASA to design and develop a crew-carrying space capsule for the "next generation of U.S. human spaceflight capabilities", in order to re-enable the launch of astronauts from U.S. soil by 2017. Two other companies, Boeing and Sierra Nevada Corporation, received similar development contracts. Advances made by all three companies under Space Act Agreements through NASA's Commercial Crew Integrated Capability (CCiCap) initiative are intended to ultimately lead to the availability of commercial human spaceflight services for both government and commercial customers. As part of this agreement, SpaceX was awarded a contract worth up to $440 million for contract deliverables between 2012 and May 2014.

At the end of 2012 SpaceX had over 40 launches on its manifest, representing about $4 billion in contract revenue. Many of those contracts were already making progress payments to SpaceX, with both commercial and government (NASA/DOD) customers., SpaceX has a total of 50 future launches under contract, two-thirds of them are for commercial customers. In late 2013, space industry media began to comment on the phenomenon that SpaceX prices are undercutting the major competitors in the commercial commsat launch market—the Ariane 5 and Proton-M—at which time SpaceX had at least 10 further geostationary orbit flights on its books.

In January 2015 SpaceX raised $1 billion in funding from Google and Fidelity, in exchange for 8.333% of the company, establishing the company valuation at approximately $12 billion. Google and Fidelity joined the then current investorship group of Draper Fisher Jurvetson, Founders Fund, Valor Equity Partners and Capricorn. Although the investment was thought to be related to SpaceX's launch of a Starlink constellation effort, Gwynne Shotwell said in March 2015 that the investment was not specifically for the global internet project. Google had been searching for a satellite internet partner since the split with O3b Networks and OneWeb.

In 2020, Abu Dhabi-based IHC or International Holding Group bought 94% stakes in a private equity fund namely, Falcon CI IV LP, which had invested in SpaceX. Following the purchase of stakes, SpaceX completed $850 million worth of equity funding round, taking the total value of the company to nearly $74 billion in March 2021. On the other hand, the stock price of IHC also surged to 75%, as of April 2021. IHC is led by Sheikh Tahnoon bin Zayed al-Nahyan as the President of the company, who also heads IHC's shareholder, Royal Group. Sheikh Tahnoon, who is the National Security Adviser of UAE also heads several other Abu Dhabi-based ventures like the International Golden Group, which has infamous ties to the Libyan and Yemeni civil war.

References

SpaceX
SpaceX
Spaceflight histories